Maria Benktzon (born 1946) is a Swedish designer, she is known for industrial design with human factors. She is a co-founder of Ergonomi Design Gruppen which later became Veryday, an industrial design consultancy located in Stockholm.

Biography  
Maria Benktzon was born in 1946 in Nyköping, Sweden. 

In 1968, Benktzon was at a conference and saw a talk given by Victor Papanek which inspired her work. In 1972, Maria Benktzon and  collaborated with in-depth ergonomic and physiological studies to investigate the grip of knives and bread saws, among other things. Their efforts were able to raised the standards for accessibility and functionality. They designed kitchenware, cutlery and personal hygiene tools; in order to allow people with limited hand strength or movement to continue their ability to use these items. 

Some of her most notable design objects include the Scandinavian Airlines (SAS) coffee pot, Tupperware knives, Doro phones, and Ejendals work gloves. Her work is in various public museum collections, including at the Museum of Modern Art (MoMA), the Cooper Hewitt, Smithsonian Design Museum, the Röhsska Museum, and the Nationalmuseum.

References 

Living people
1946 births
Swedish industrial designers